The West of Scotland Schools' Symphony Orchestra (WSSSO) is a youth orchestra run by the West of Scotland Schools Orchestras (WSSO) Trust, which also runs the West of Scotland Schools Concert Band). The orchestra is conducted by James Lowe. It was established in 1996 after the break-up of the former Strathclyde region, and provides professional training and performance opportunities for talented young musicians from the west of Scotland.

Partnerships 

The orchestra works in partnership with the Royal Conservatoire of Scotland, Royal Scottish National Orchestra (RSNO), and the University of Strathclyde to provide musical activities for its members throughout the academic year.

Calendar 
November: Auditions take place. Candidates are required to play a single piece and undertake a sight-reading test.
January: Solo/Concerto competition. This is an opportunity for members to compete for a chance to feature as a soloist in the orchestra's programme for the following year.
April: Taster day. Held at the University of Strathclyde. The orchestra meets to rehearse and perform a programme in just one day.
May: Joint rehearsal with RSNO. It is held at the Glasgow Royal Concert Hall.
June: A residential course, week-long course, usually held at Carberry Tower, in Musselburgh. This culminates in a concert at a venue such as Paisley Town Hall.
August: Further public concerts, including the Schools Concerts Initiative which sees the orchestra visit a partner local authority secondary school to perform, and a Joint Showcase Concert performance with the Concert Band in Glasgow's City Halls, Grand Hall.

Performances 

Concerts are played in venues such as New Lanark, Vikingar, and RSAMD concert hall, and are well attended. Their 2004 performance at the NAYO festival was described as "a very expressive and enjoyable performance."

In June 2006, WSSSO premiered Martin Suckling's Morning Star at Motherwell Town Hall.

See also 
 List of youth orchestras

References

External links
 Homepage of the orchestra and band
 National Association of Youth Orchestras' homepage
 Martin Suckling's homepage

British symphony orchestras
Culture in Edinburgh
Music in Glasgow
Musical groups established in 1996
Scottish youth orchestras
1996 establishments in Scotland